The Moldavian campaign or the Polish–Ottoman War of 1497–1499 was an unsuccessful war against the Moldavians, supported by the Turks, led by John Albert of Poland who set out with an army of 80,000 men with the objectives of deposing Stephen the Great of Moldavia and replacing him with Sigismund Jagello, reconquering the fortresses on the northern Black Sea coast and taking control of Crimea and the Danube Delta.

Background
John I Albert was elected due to his advocacy for an offensive policy against the Ottomans, and he made an alliance with Venice and Hungary for a joint effort against them. Stephen the Great of Moldavia refused to join the alliance fearing that Moldavia would be the main scene of any Polish–Ottoman war. Albert's efforts to displace him led to a quarrel with Ladislas of Hungary who considered Stephen as his vassal. This broke up their recent alliance and as a result, Albert planned on achieving his objectives without any foreign help. After some years of preparation, Albert sent an envoy to Istanbul asking for peace but Bayazid II rejected this and both sides were ready for war by 1497.

Battle
Albert was able to raise an army of 80,000 men and 200 cannons, in the summer of 1497 he set out planning to reconquer the fortresses on the northern Black Sea coast and take control of Crimea and the Danube Delta, while Stephen the Great of Moldavia was able to secure Ottoman support. The Polish offensive began in the month of June in 1497, but the Moldavians, supported by the Ottomans, crossed into Bukovina and decisively defeated the Poles at Valea Cosminului (Battle of the Cosmin Forest) and then proceeded to raid into Polish territory as far as Lwów. Albert's campaign was disastrous and his objectives had failed, so he made peace with the Moldavians and Ottomans in 1499 and recognised Ottoman control of the Black Sea.

Consequences
As a result of this campaign, the Crimean Tatars were now left with a major empire including the entire steppe north of the Crimea from the Dniester to the Volga under the suzerainty of the Ottoman sultan.

References

Wars involving Moldavia
Battles involving Moldavia
Stephen the Great
Wars involving Poland
Battles involving Poland
Wars involving the Ottoman Empire
Battles involving the Ottoman Empire